Reidel may refer to:
D. Reidel, a company
Reidel Anthony
Werner D. Reidel A.

Similar terms
Riedel